The Belgian Cup 2005-06 was the 51st staging of the Belgian Cup which is the main knock-out football competition in Belgium.  It was won by S.V. Zulte-Waregem. After the first 5 rounds teams from the Belgian First Division entered the competition on November 10, 2005.  The sixth round ended on December 6, 2005 and saw the surprise defeat of Anderlecht to second division side Geel after penalty shootout.  The seventh round was held on December 21, 2005. From the quarter-finals on matches were played in two legs.  The first team to host is indicated first in the following chart.  The final game was played at the King Baudouin Stadium on May 13, 2006.

Starting Rounds

Legend
 D2 = second division
 D3 = third division
 P = promotion
 PR1 = provincial, First division
 PR2 = provincial, Second division
 PR3 = provincial, Third division
 PR4 = provincial, Fourth division

Round 1

Group 1

Group 2

Group 3

Group 4

Group 5

Group 6

Group 7

Group 8

Round 2

Group 1

Group 2

Group 3

Group 4

Group 5

Group 6

Group 7

Group 8

Round 3

Round 4

Round 5

Final Stages

Legend
 D2 = second division
 D3 = third division
 P = promotion

See also
Belgian Cup - main article

References
 Sport.be website  - results
 Sport.be website  - results

Belgian Cup seasons
Belgian Cup, 2005-06
2005–06 domestic association football cups